The Kosovo national futsal team represents Kosovo in international men's futsal. It is controlled by the Football Federation of Kosovo, the governing body for football in Kosovo, which also controls futsal.

History

Permitting by FIFA to play friendlies
On 6 February 2013, FIFA gave the permission to play international friendly games against other member associations. Whereas, on 13 January 2014, there was a change of this permit that forbade Kosovo to play against the national teams of the countries of the former Yugoslavia. Club teams were also allowed to play friendlies and this happened after a FIFA Emergency Committee meeting. However, it was stipulated that clubs and representative teams of the Football Federation of Kosovo may not display national symbols as flags, emblems, etc. or play national anthems. The go-ahead was given after meetings between the Football Association of Serbia and Sepp Blatter.

Membership in UEFA and FIFA

In September 2015 at an UEFA Executive Committee meeting in Malta was approved the request from the federation to the admission in UEFA to the next Ordinary Congress to be held in Budapest. On 3 May 2016, at the Ordinary Congress. Kosovo were accepted into UEFA after members voted 28–24 in favor of Kosovo. Ten days later, Kosovo was accepted in FIFA during their 66th congress in Mexico with 141 votes in favour and 23 against.

Competitive record

FIFA Futsal World Cup
On 12 December 2018, in Nyon, it was decided that Kosovo should be part in Group B of the 2020 FIFA Futsal World Cup qualification, together with Andorra, Belarus and Norway. On 30 January 2019, Kosovo made their debut on FIFA Futsal World Cup qualifications with a 5–0 away defeat against Belarus.

UEFA Futsal Championship
On 21 October 2016, in Nyon, it was decided that Kosovo should be part in Group E of the UEFA Futsal Euro 2018 qualifying, together with Cyprus, Denmark and Norway. On 30 January 2017, Kosovo made his debut on UEFA Futsal Euro qualifying with a 1–5 away win against Norway that was simultaneously also the first-ever competitive win.

Non-FIFA Tournament
Kosovo has so far participated in two international tournaments. first at the Futsal Week 2016, an international futsal tournament. In which they won  this tournament after beating Finland and Turkey in the Groupstage. They also participated at the 2021 Continental Futsal Championship in Thailand.

Fixtures and results

2021

2022

2023

Players

Current squad
The following players have been called up for the 2024 FIFA Futsal World Cup qualifications.

Kosovo versus other countries
Head-to-head records are included only matches as FIFA member.

See also
Men's
National team
Under-21
Under-19
Under-17
Under-15
Women's
National team
Under-19
Under-17

Notes and references

Notes

References

External links
 
Kosovo (futsal) News about the team

Futsal
European national futsal teams